Alepidocline is a genus of flowering plants in the family Asteraceae described as a genus in 1934.

Alepidocline is native to southern Mexico, Guatemala, and western Venezuela.

 Species
 Alepidocline annua S.F. Blake - Chiapas, Guatemala, Táchira
 Alepidocline breedlovei (B.L.Turner) B.L. Turner - Chiapas
 Alepidocline macdonaldana B.L.Turner - Oaxaca
 Alepidocline macrocephala (H. Rob.) B.L. Turner - Mérida
 Alepidocline pochutlana B.L. Turner - Oaxaca
 Alepidocline trifida (J.J. Fay) B.L. Turner - Oaxaca

References

Millerieae
Asteraceae genera